Tiffin City School District is a public school district in the city of Tiffin, Ohio, United States. Currently, there are approximately 2,850 students that attend Tiffin City Schools. This school district consists of three elementary buildings that hold two grades each, which are K-1, 2–3, and 4–5; one middle school which has grades 6-8 and one high school which contains grades 9–12.  The mission statement of the school district is, “Tiffin City Schools guarantees that all students achieve success at their full learning potential.” 

Columbian High School is the building that contains grades 9-12 for the district.  It houses approximately 900 students and 85 staff members.  Students that attend Columbian do not only have the option to take the 139 classes that are offered, they can also take courses through Post Secondary Education Options at three different institutions.  Those institutions include Heidelberg University, Tiffin University and Terra Community College.  Several students attend Sentinel Career Center and the Technology Center.  There are also 17 varsity sports and 25 clubs that students can be involved with throughout the school year.

Tiffin Middle School houses grades 6–8.  The school was built in 2003 making it the newest building within the school district.  This school accommodates about 650 students and 65 staff members.  There are many different class options that the students can choose from and there are also selected athletics that students may participate in during the school year.

There are also three elementary buildings that contain grades K-5.  These buildings are Washington Elementary, Krout Elementary, and Noble Elementary.

Schools

Elementary schools
Krout Elementary School (Grades 2-3
Noble Elementary School (Grades 4-5
Washington Elementary School (Grades K through 1st ) 151 Elmer St. Tiffin, OH 44883

Middle schools
Tiffin Middle School (Grades 6th through 8th)

High schools
Columbian High School (Grades 9th through 12th)

References

External links
Tiffin City School District website

School districts in Ohio
Education in Seneca County, Ohio